Giannis Katsaros (born 6 July 1978) is a Greek former professional footballer.

References

1978 births
Living people
Agrotikos Asteras F.C. players
Panionios F.C. players
PAS Giannina F.C. players
Ilisiakos F.C. players
Enosi Alexandroupoli players
Kalamata F.C. players
Panetolikos F.C. players
Olympiacos Volos F.C. players
Diagoras F.C. players
Makedonikos F.C. players
Kallithea F.C. players
Apollon Smyrnis F.C. players
Paniliakos F.C. players
Super League Greece players
Association football wingers
Footballers from Athens
Greek footballers